Gerald R. Torr (born November 28, 1957) is an American politician. He is a member of the Indiana House of Representatives from the 39th District, serving since 1996. He is a member of the Republican Party.

References

1957 births
Living people
Republican Party members of the Indiana House of Representatives
21st-century American politicians
People from Greencastle, Indiana
Musicians Institute alumni
Hanover College alumni